Art Cosgrove, (born 1 June 1940) in Newry, County Down, Northern Ireland, was president of University College Dublin (UCD) between 1994 and 2003.

Education
He was educated at the Abbey Christian Brothers' Grammar School, Newry. He graduated  from Queen's University Belfast in 1961 with a first class honours BA in History, and attended the Institute of Historical Research, in London from  1961 to 1962. He was awarded his PhD by Queen's in 1971 and an LLD honoris causa in 1975 for distinction in historical work. In 2007 Cosgrove obtained the Barrister-at-Law degree qualification from King's Inns but declined to take the statutory Irish exams needed to be called to the Bar by the Chief Justice of Ireland. He took legal action over the issue. Cosgrove is understood to be fluent in Irish but feels that the exam required by legislation passed in 1929 to be inappropriate in 2007. The law was changed to provide a system for Barristers to learn Irish as part of their studies.

References

1940 births
People from Newry
Presidents of University College Dublin
Alumni of Queen's University Belfast
Living people
People educated at Abbey Christian Brothers' Grammar School
Alumni of King's Inns